Fahaheel is an area in Kuwait, located in the Ahmadi Governorate. It is located east of the Ahmadi area and is on the coast of the Persian Gulf. The Fahaheel Fish Market is a major fish market in Kuwait. The market is located on the seashore of Fahaheel. It is a traditional style fresh fish market and is directly supplied by fishermen on the wharf coming from their boats with buckets of fish in their hand.  The shrimp season starts in September and ends in early February. Fahaheel is home to the Al Kout Mall as well as several other traditional and modern shops.

Etymology
The area is named after a diminutive form for the word for masculine palm tree in Arabic, فحيحيل from فحل.

References

Districts of Al Ahmadi Governorate